The National Service Projects Organization (NSPO) manufactures military and civilian products and provide contracting services.

It is subordinate to the Egyptian Ministry of Defense system, was its establishment in accordance with Presidential Decree No. 32 of 1979 under President Anwar Sadat, and describes a device aimed at the "achievement of relative self-sufficiency of the main needs of the armed forces to ease the burden of management of the burden of the state with the introduction of excess production capacities in the local market and help in state economic development projects through a sophisticated industrial base productivity.

See also

 Economy of the Egyptian Armed Forces

References

Defence agencies of Egypt
Defence companies of Egypt